The national symbols of Croatia are flags, coat of arms, icons or cultural expressions that are emblematic, representative or otherwise characteristic of Croatia or Croatian culture.

Flags

Anthem

Heraldry

Flora and fauna

People

Unofficial symbols

References